Including players from the Newcastle Knights that have represented while at the club.

International

Australia
    Mark Sargent (1990, 1992)
    Brad Godden (1992)
    Paul Harragon (1992–95, 1998)
    Jamie Ainscough (1995)
    Andrew Johns (1995, 1998–03, 2005–06)
    Matthew Johns (1995, 1999)
    Adam Muir (1995)
    Robbie O'Davis (1995, 1998)
    Matthew Gidley (1999-02, 2004)
    Ben Kennedy (2000–02, 2004)
    Adam MacDougall (2000–01)
    Danny Buderus (2001–06)
    Steve Simpson (2002–03, 2006–07)
    Timana Tahu (2002, 2004)
    Kurt Gidley (2007–10, 2013)
    Akuila Uate (2011-12)
    Darius Boyd (2012-14)
    Beau Scott (2014)
    Sione Mata'utia (2014)
    Dane Gagai (2017)

Cook Islands
    Jason Temu (2000)
    Johnathon Ford (2009)
    Keith Lulia (2009-11)
    Zane Tetevano (2009, 2011, 2013)
    Zeb Taia (2010-11)
    Sam Mataora (2015)

England
    Chris Joynt (1995)
    Dom Young (2022)

Fiji
    Wes Naiqama (2008–10)
    Akuila Uate (2008–09, 2013)
    Kevin Naiqama (2009-10, 2013)
    Korbin Sims (2013-15)
    Daniel Saifiti (2015)
    Jacob Saifiti (2015)

Great Britain
    Brian Carney (2006)

Italy
    Cameron Ciraldo (2009, 2011)
    Josh Mantellato (2013)
    Kade Snowden (2013)
    Jack Johns (2017)

Lebanon
    George Ndaira (2009)
    James Elias (2014–15)

New Zealand
    Adrian Shelford (1988)
    Sam Stewart (1988–89)
    James Goulding (1989)
    Tony Kemp (1989–93)
    Junior Sa'u (2009–10)
    Zeb Taia (2010)
    Danny Levi (2017)

Papua New Guinea
    Neville Costigan (2013)

Rest of the World
    Adrian Shelford (1988)
    Sam Stewart (1988)
    Lee Jackson (1997)

Samoa
     George Carmont (2006–07)
     Peter Mata'utia (2009, 17)
     Mark Taufua (2009-10)
     Constantine Mika (2010)
     David Fa'alogo (2013-14)
     Joseph Leilua (2013-15)
     Pat Mata'utia (2015)
     Carlos Tuimavave (2015)
     Sione Mata'utia (2017)
     Mason Lino (2019)
     Hymel Hunt (2019)
     Herman Ese'ese (2019)
     James Gavet (2019)
     Danny Levi (2019)

Tonga
    Richard Fa'aoso (2008–11)
    Cooper Vuna (2008)
    Sione Tovo (2009)
    Alai Taufa'ao (2010)
    Siuatonga Likiliki (2013)

State of Origin

New South Wales
    Mark Sargent (1990)
    Paul Harragon (1992–98)
    Robbie McCormack (1992–93)
    Andrew Johns (1995-00, 2002–03, 2005)
    Matthew Johns (1995, 1998)
    Adam Muir (1995–97)
    Jamie Ainscough (1996)
    Tony Butterfield (1998)
    Adam MacDougall (1998-01)
    Darren Albert (1999)
    Matthew Gidley (2000–04)
    Ben Kennedy (2000–05)
    Mark Hughes (2001)
    Danny Buderus (2002–08)
    Steve Simpson (2002, 2005–08)
    Timana Tahu (2002–04)
    Josh Perry (2003)
    Kurt Gidley (2007–11)
    Jarrod Mullen (2007)
    Ben Cross (2008)
    James McManus (2009, 2013–14)
    Akuila Uate (2011-12)
    Beau Scott (2014-15)
    David Klemmer (2019)
    Daniel Saifiti (2019-21)
    Mitchell Pearce (2019)
    Jacob Saifiti (2022)

Queensland
    Michael Hagan (1989–90)
    Mike McLean (1991)
    Adrian Brunker (1992–93)
    Robbie O'Davis (1995–99, 2002)
    Darius Boyd (2012-14)
    Dane Gagai (2015-17, 2022)
    Kalyn Ponga (2018-19, 2021-22)
    Tim Glasby (2019)
    Edrick Lee (2020)

City vs Country Origin

New South Wales City
    Jamie Ainscough (1995-96)
    Adam Cuthbertson (2013)
    Nathan Ross (2017)

New South Wales Country
    Tony Butterfield (1989)
    Mark Sargent (1989, 1992, 1994)
    Gary Wurth (1989)
    John Allanson (1990)
    Scott Carter (1990)
    Marc Glanville (1991, 1994, 1997)
    Ashley Gordon (1991, 1995)
    Paul Harragon (1992-97)
    Robbie McCormack (1992–94)
    Adam Muir (1995–96)
    Darren Treacy (1995)
    Wayne Richards (1997)
    Darren Albert (2001)
    Danny Buderus (2001, 2003, 2005, 2007–08)
    Josh Perry (2001–04)
    Steve Simpson (2001–02, 2005)
    Timana Tahu (2001–03)
    Mark Hughes (2002)
    John Morris (2002)
    Matt Parsons (2002)
    Daniel Abraham (2003–04)
    Ben Kennedy (2003)
    Andrew Johns (2003)
    Kurt Gidley (2004, 2006–07)
    Matthew Gidley (2005)
    Anthony Quinn (2006)
    Clint Newton (2007)
    Ben Cross (2008)
    James McManus (2009, 2012–15)
    Jarrod Mullen (2009, 2011–12, 2014)
    Chris Houston (2011)
    Akuila Uate (2011, 2013, 2015)
    Willie Mason (2013)
    Alex McKinnon (2013)
    Tyrone Roberts (2014)
    Robbie Rochow (2014)
    Beau Scott (2014)
    Tariq Sims (2015)
    Kade Snowden (2015)

All Stars Match

Indigenous All Stars
    Cory Paterson (2010-11)
    Timana Tahu (2013)
    Travis Waddell (2013)
    Dane Gagai (2015-16)
    Tyrone Roberts (2015)

NRL All Stars/World All Stars
    Kurt Gidley (2010-11)
    Akuila Uate (2011, 2013)
    Kade Snowden (2012)
    Willie Mason (2013)
    Beau Scott (2015)
    Jeremy Smith (2015-16)

Other honours

New Zealand Māori
    Paul Rauhihi (2000)

Prime Minister's XIII
    Kurt Gidley (2005–07)
    Clint Newton (2005)
    Jarrod Mullen (2006)
    Adam Woolnough (2006)
    Ben Cross (2008)
    Cory Paterson (2008)
    Akuila Uate (2010, 2012)
    Darius Boyd (2012)
    Sione Mata'utia (2014)
    Beau Scott (2014)
    Dane Gagai (2015)

Representative Captains

World Cup captains
Australia
    Paul Harragon (1995)

Cook Islands
     Jason Temu (Vice-Captain - 2000)

Fiji
     Wes Naiqama (2008)

Papua New Guinea
     Neville Costigan (2013)

Test captains
Australia
    Paul Harragon (1995)
    Andrew Johns (2002–03)
    Danny Buderus (2004–05)

Samoa
    George Carmont (2006–07)
    David Fa'alogo (2014)

State of Origin captains
New South Wales
    Andrew Johns (2002–03)
    Danny Buderus (2004–08)
    Kurt Gidley (2009–11)

City vs Country Origin captains
New South Wales Country
    Danny Buderus (2007–08)
    Beau Scott (2014)

All Stars captains
NRL All Stars
    Beau Scott (2015)

Representative Coaching Staff

International
Fiji
    Rick Stone (Coach - 2013–15)

Tonga
    Rohan Smith (Coach - 2009)

State of Origin
Queensland
    Michael Hagan (Coach - 2004–05)

All Stars Match
NRL All Stars
    Wayne Bennett (Coach - 2012–13)

References

 
Newcastle Knights
Rugby league representative players lists